Spodoptera pectinicornis (waterlettuce moth) is a moth of the  family Noctuidae native to Asia, where it can be found from the northeastern parts of the Himalaya to Sundaland and in New Guinea. It has been introduced as a biocontrol agent of waterlettuce in Florida in 1990, but the attempt was unsuccessful.

The larvae feed on Pistia stratiotes and Eichhornia crassipes.

External links
Info

Spodoptera
Moths described in 1895